Challace Joe McMillin (March 18, 1942 – March 8, 2020) was an American football, track and field, and cross country coach. He was the first head coach of James Madison University's football program, serving from 1972 to 1984 and compiling a record of 67–60–2. A native of Gilt Edge, Tennessee, McMillin was a high school coach in Memphis, Tennessee before coming to James Madison in 1971, when he launched the school's track and field program and also coached cross country. McMillin was also a member of the faculty in James Madison's kinesiology department.

McMillin died on March 8, 2020, ten days before his 78th birthday.

Head coaching record

References

1942 births
2020 deaths
James Madison Dukes football coaches
James Madison University faculty
Rhodes Lynx football players
College cross country coaches in the United States
College track and field coaches in the United States
People from Tipton County, Tennessee
Coaches of American football from Tennessee
Players of American football from Tennessee